Marilyn Louise Brown (March 9, 1953 – July 28, 1998) was an American actress who performed on stage and in television dramas and feature films. She was the sister of actor/author/playwright Barry Brown and author James Brown.

Early life

Marilyn Louise Brown was born on March 9, 1953, in San Jose, California.  Her parents were Donald Bernard Brown and Vivian Brown (née Agrillo). She was of mixed English, Irish, Sicilian, and Scottish descent. Her father named her after his favorite actress, Marilyn Monroe.

She started studying tap dancing, modern dance, and acting beginning in pre-teens, and continuing into her late teens at an acting school run by the actor Bo Hopkins; during that time, she appeared in several off-off Broadway plays. She also got married around that time.

Career
Marilyn and her brother Barry both made their film debuts in uncredited bit roles in the 1958 motion picture In Love and War. Brown had small roles in the lowbrow mid-70s drive-in exploitation comedies Chesty Anderson U.S. Navy and The Amorous Adventures of Don Quixote and Sancho Panza. Outside of her sparse movie credits, Marilyn also acted in a few off-off-Broadway stage productions.

Personal life
Brown committed suicide at age 44 on July 28, 1998.

Her childhood and family life with her brother Barry were discussed in books by her younger brother James—Hot Wire (1985), Final Performance (1988), and The Los Angeles Diaries (2003).

Films 
 Chesty Anderson U.S. Navy (1976) - Barracks Girl
 The Amorous Adventures of Don Quixote and Sancho Panza (1976) - Maid
 In Love and War (1958)

References

External links 
 IMDb
 Barry Brown

1953 births
1998 deaths
Actresses from San Jose, California
American film actresses
American stage actresses
American television actresses
20th-century American actresses
1997 suicides
Suicides by jumping in California